Robert Adolph Wilton Morley, CBE (26 May 1908 – 3 June 1992) was an English actor who enjoyed a lengthy career in both Britain and the United States. He was frequently cast as a pompous English gentleman representing the Establishment, often in supporting roles. In 1939 he received an Academy Award nomination for Best Supporting Actor for his portrayal of King Louis XVI in Marie Antoinette.

In Movie Encyclopedia, film critic Leonard Maltin describes Morley as "recognisable by his ungainly bulk, bushy eyebrows, thick lips and double chin, ... particularly effective when cast as a pompous windbag." Ephraim Katz in his International Film Encyclopaedia describes Morley as "a rotund, triple-chinned, delightful character player of the British and American stage and screen." In his autobiography, Responsible Gentleman, Morley said his stage career started with managements valuing his appearance for playing "substantial gentleman" roles – as a doctor, lawyer, accountant or other professional member of society.

Early life
Morley was born in Semley, Wiltshire, England, the son of Gertrude Emily (née Fass) and Robert Wilton Morley, a major in the British Army. His mother came from a German family that had emigrated to South Africa. Morley attended Wellington College, Berkshire, which he hated, followed by RADA. As he was a famous "Old Wellingtonian", generations of headmasters tried to contact him, without success, with Morley stating "the only reason for me visiting Wellington would be to burn it down".

Career
Morley made his West End stage debut in 1929 in Treasure Island at the Strand Theatre and his Broadway debut in 1938 in the title role of Oscar Wilde at the Fulton Theatre. Although soon won over to the big screen, Morley remained both a busy West End star and successful author, as well as appearing in touring productions.

A versatile actor, especially in his younger years, he played Louis XVI in Marie Antoinette (1938), for which he received an Academy Award nomination as Best Supporting Actor.

He co-wrote several plays for the stage. His 1937 play Goodness, How Sad was turned into an Ealing Studios film, Return to Yesterday (1940), directed by Robert Stevenson. Later, he had outstanding success in London and New York with Edward, My Son, a gripping family drama written in 1947 in collaboration with Noel Langley. Morley played the central role of Arnold Holt, but in the disappointing film version Spencer Tracy was miscast, turning Holt, an unscrupulous English businessman, into a blustering Canadian expatriate. Edward, My Son (1949) was directed by George Cukor for MGM-British. Morley's acting career continued with roles as a missionary in The African Queen (1951), The Story of Gilbert and Sullivan (1953), as W. S. Gilbert, and in Oscar Wilde (1960). In 1959 he appeared in an Alfred Hitchcock Presents adaptation of a Stanley Ellin short story entitled, 'Specialty of the House'.

Ken Annakin's Those Magnificent Men in Their Flying Machines was released 16 June 1965. In the British period comedy film, Morley is featured among an international ensemble cast including Stuart Whitman, Sarah Miles, Terry-Thomas, James Fox, Red Skelton, Benny Hill, Jean-Pierre Cassel, Gert Fröbe and Alberto Sordi. The film, revolving around the craze of early aviation circa 1910, is about a pompous newspaper magnate (Morley) who is convinced, by his daughter (Miles) and her fiancé (Fox), to organize an air race from London to Paris. A large sum of money is offered to the winner, hence it attracts a variety of characters who participate. The film received positive reviews, describing it as funny, colourful, clever and having captured the early enthusiasm for aviation. It was treated as a major production, one of only three full-length 70 mm Todd-AO Fox releases in 1965 with an intermission and musical interlude part of the original screenings. Because of the Todd-AO process, the film was an exclusive roadshow feature initially shown in deluxe Cinerama venues, where customers needed reserved seats purchased ahead of time. The film grossed $31,111,111 theatrically and on home video $29,950,000. Audience reaction both in first release and even today, is nearly universal in assessing the film as one of the "classic" aviation films.

Morley also personified the conservative Englishman in many comedy and caper films. He was the face of BOAC (later British Airways) as the merry television commercial spokesman of the 1970s with "We'll take good care of you" for British Airways. Later in his career, he received critical acclaim and numerous accolades for his performance in Who Is Killing the Great Chefs of Europe? 
During the 1980s, Morley hosted a celebrity cooking show on Cable TV, Celebrity Chefs. In 1980, Morley hosted (providing explanatory introductions) the 14-episode Granada Television anthology series Ladykillers.

He was renowned as a witty raconteur and for being an eloquent conversationalist, as well as a noted and enthusiastic gourmet, in real life and in various roles in film and TV.

Morley was honoured by being the first King of Moomba appointed by the Melbourne Moomba festival committee and, in typical humility, he accepted the crown in bare feet. Morley was in Australia touring his one-man show, The Sound of Morley.

In his book British Film Character Actors, Terence Pettigrew wrote: "Morley, who has more wobbly chins than a Shanghai drinking club, enjoys poking fun at life's absurdities, among whom he generously includes himself."

He was the subject of This Is Your Life in 1974 when he was surprised by Eamonn Andrews.

Personal life and honours
Robert Morley married Joan Buckmaster (1910–2005), a daughter of Dame Gladys Cooper. Their elder son, Sheridan Morley, became a writer and critic. They also had a daughter, Annabel, and another son, Wilton.

Morley was appointed a Commander of the Order of the British Empire (CBE) in 1957 and was also offered a knighthood in 1975 but declined.

Morley lived for decades at Wargrave, Berkshire.

Death
Morley died in Reading, England, from a stroke aged 84 on 3 June 1992.

Theatre career

 First stage appearance in Dr Syn (Hippodrome, Margate, 28 May 1928)
 First London role, a pirate in Treasure Island (Strand Theatre, Christmas 1929)
 Touring, plus Playhouse Oxford and Festival Cambridge repertory, (1931–1933)
 Oakes in Up in the Air (Royalty Theatre, London 1933)
 Touring with Sir Frank Benson (1934–35)
 Ran a repertory company with Peter Bull (Perranporth, Cornwall, 1935)
 Title role in Oscar Wilde (Gate Theatre Studio, Villiers Street, London, 1936)
 Alexandre Dumas in The Great Romancer (Strand Theatre and New Theatre, 1937)
 Henry Higgins in Pygmalion (Old Vic Theatre, 1937)
 Title role in Oscar Wilde (Fulton Theatre, New York, October 1938)
 Title role in Springtime for Henry (Perranporth, 1939)
 Descius Heiss in Play with Fire (try-out version of The Shop at Sly Corner, Theatre Royal, Brighton, 1941)
 Sheridan Whiteside in The Man Who Came to Dinner (Savoy Theatre — and on tour – 1941–43)
 Charles in Staff Dance (also wrote, touring UK, 1944)
 Prince Regent in The First Gentleman (New Theatre and Savoy, 1945–46)
 Arnold Holt in Edward, My Son (also co-wrote, His Majesty's Theatre, 1947; also played this role at the Martin Beck Theatre New York 1948, and in Australia and New Zealand, 1949–50)
 Philip in The Little Hut (Lyric Theatre, 1950)
 Hippo in Hippo Dancing (also adapted, Lyric, 1954)
 Oswald Petersham in A Likely Tale (Globe Theatre, 1956)
 Panisse in the musical Fanny (Drury Lane, 1956)
 The Tunnel of Love (directed, Her Majesty's, 1957)
 Sebastian Le Boeuf in Hook, Line and Sinker (also adapted, Piccadilly Theatre, 1958)
 Once More, with Feeling (directed, New Theatre, 1959)
 Mr Asano in A Majority of One (Phoenix Theatre, 1960)
 Title role in Mr Rhodes (Theatre Royal Windsor, 1961)
 The Bishop in A Time to Laugh (Piccadilly, 1962)
 The Sound of Morley (One-man show, touring Australia 1966–67)
 Sir Mallalieu Fitzbuttress in Halfway Up the Tree (Queen's Theatre, 1967)
 Frank Foster in How the Other Half Loves (Lyric, 1970; also North America, 1972, and Australia, 1973)
 Barnstable in A Ghost on Tiptoe (also co-wrote, Savoy, 1974)
 Pound in Banana Ridge (Savoy, 1976)
 Toured Robert Morley Talks to Everyone (1978)
 Picture of Innocence (co-wrote and toured UK and Canada, 1978)
 Hilary in Alan Bennett's The Old Country (Theatre Royal, Sydney, 1980)

Complete filmography

 Scrooge (1935) as Rich man (uncredited)
 Marie Antoinette (1938) as King Louis XVI
 You Will Remember (1941) as Tom Barrett / Leslie Stuart
 Major Barbara (1941) as Andrew Undershaft
 The Big Blockade (1942) as German: Von Geiselbrecht
 This Was Paris (1942) as Van Der Stuyl
 Partners in Crime (1942, Short) as Judge (uncredited)
 The Foreman Went to France (1942) as Mayor Coutare of Bivary
 The Young Mr. Pitt (1942) as Charles James Fox
 I Live in Grosvenor Square (aka A Yank in London) (1945), as Duke of Exmoor
 The Ghosts of Berkeley Square (1947) as Gen. "Jumbo" Burlap
 The Small Back Room (1949) (credited as "A Guest") as The Minister (uncredited)
 Edward, My Son (1949) as Cameo (uncredited)
 Outcast of the Islands (1951) as Elmer Almayer
 The African Queen (1951) as Reverend Samuel Sayer, "The Brother"
 Curtain Up (1952) (opposite Margaret Rutherford) as Harry Derwent Blacker
 The Story of Gilbert and Sullivan (1953) as W.S. Gilbert
 Melba (1953) as Oscar Hammerstein I 
 The Final Test (1953) as Alexander Whitehead
 Beat the Devil (1953) as Peterson
 The Good Die Young (1954) as Sir Francis Ravenscourt
 The Rainbow Jacket (1954) as Lord Logan
 Beau Brummell (1954) as King George III
 The Adventures of Quentin Durward (1955) as Louis XI of France
 A Likely Tale (1956, TV Movie) as Oswald Petersham / Jonah Petersham
 Loser Takes All (1956) as Dreuther
 Around the World in 80 Days (1956) as Gauthier Ralph
 Fanny (1956, TV Movie) as Panisse
 Law and Disorder (1958) as Judge Crichton
 The Sheriff of Fractured Jaw (1958) as Uncle Lucius
 The Doctor's Dilemma (1959) as Sir Ralph Bloomfield-Bonington
 The Journey (1959) as Hugh Deverill
 Libel (1959) as Sir Wilfred
 The Battle of the Sexes (1959) as Robert MacPherson
 Oscar Wilde (1960) as Oscar Wilde
 A Majority of One (1960, TV Movie) as Koichi Asano
 The Story of Joseph and His Brethren (1961) as Potiphar
 The Young Ones (1961) as Hamilton Black
 Go to Blazes (1962) as Arson Eddie
 The Road to Hong Kong (1962) as Leader of the 3rd Echelon
 The Boys (1962) as Montgomery
 Nine Hours to Rama (1963) as P.K. Mussadi
 Murder at the Gallop (1963) (opposite Margaret Rutherford) as Hector Enderby
 The Old Dark House (1963) as Roderick Femm
 Take Her, She's Mine (1963) as Mr. Pope-Jones
 Ladies Who Do (1963) as Colonel Whitforth
 Hot Enough for June (1964) as Colonel Cuncliffe
 Of Human Bondage (1964) as Dr. Jacobs
 Rhythm 'n' Greens (1964, Short) as Narrator
 Topkapi (1964) as Cedric Page
 Genghis Khan (1965) as Emperor of China
 Those Magnificent Men in Their Flying Machines (1965) as Lord Rawnsley
 A Study in Terror (1965) as Mycroft Holmes
 The Loved One (1965) as Sir Ambrose Ambercrombie
 Life at the Top (1965) as Tiffield
 The Dot and the Line: A Romance in Lower Mathematics (1965) as Narrator
 The Alphabet Murders (aka The ABC Murders) (1965) as Captain Arthur Hastings
 Treasure Island (1965, Short)
 Tender Scoundrel (1966) as Lord Swift
 Hotel Paradiso (1966) as Henri Cotte
 Lucy in London (1966, TV Movie)
 Way...Way Out (1966) as Harold Quonset
 Finders Keepers (1966) as Colonel Roberts
 The Trygon Factor (1966) as Hubert Hamlyn
 Woman Times Seven (1967) as Dr. Xavier - episode "Super Simone"
 Luther (1968 TV movie) as Pope Leo X
 Hot Millions (1968) as Caesar Smith
 Some Girls Do (1969) as Miss Mary
 Sinful Davey (1969) as Duke of Argyll
 Twinky (1969) as Judge Roxborough
 Doctor in Trouble (1970) as Captain George Spratt
 Cromwell (1970) as The Earl of Manchester
 Song of Norway (1970) as Berg
 When Eight Bells Toll  (1971) as Uncle Arthur
 Many Moons (1973, Short) as Narrator
 Theatre of Blood (1973) as Meredith Merridew
 Great Expectations (1974, TV Movie) as Uncle Pumblechook
 Hugo the Hippo (1976) as The Sultan (voice) 
 The Blue Bird (1976) as Father Time
 The Fortune Hunters (1976, TV Movie) as Mr. Justice Bosanquet
 Who Is Killing the Great Chefs of Europe? (aka Too Many Chefs) (1978) as Max Vandeveer
 The Human Factor (1979) as Dr. Percival
 Scavenger Hunt (1979) as Charles Bernstein
 Tales of the Unexpected (1980) as Harry Knox
 Oh! Heavenly Dog (1980) as Bernie
 Loophole (1981) as Godfrey
 The Great Muppet Caper (1981) as British Gentlemen
 The Deadly Game (1982, TV Movie) as Emile Carpeau
 High Road to China (1983) as Bentik
 The Old Men at the Zoo (1983, BBC TV mini-series) as Lord Godmanchester
 Second Time Lucky (1984) as God
 Alice in Wonderland (1985, TV Movie) as King of Hearts
 The Wind (1986, direct to video) as Elias Appleby
 The Trouble with Spies (1987) as Angus
 Little Dorrit (1988) as Lord Decimus Barnacle
 War and Remembrance (1988–1989, TV Series) as Alistair Tudsbury
 The Lady and the Highwayman (1989, TV Movie) as Lord Chancellor
 Istanbul (1989) as Atkins (final film role)

Publications

 
 
 More Morley (1978)
 Robert Morley's Book of Bricks (1978)
 Worry! (with Margaret Morley, 1979)
 Robert Morley's Book of Worries (U.K. Version of Worry!) (with Margaret Morley, 1979)
 The Pleasures of Age (Hoddder and Stoughton) (1988 ) (re-published in a 'Coronet' imprint 1989)

References

External links

 
 
 
 
 
 
 Britmovie (Robert Morley)

1908 births
1992 deaths
Alumni of RADA
Commanders of the Order of the British Empire
English male film actors
English people of German descent
English male stage actors
People educated at Elizabeth College, Guernsey
People educated at Wellington College, Berkshire
People from Wiltshire
20th-century English male actors
British expatriate male actors in the United States